Frédéric Teixido (born 27 May 1972) is a French former professional rugby league footballer who represented France in the 1995 and 2000 World Cups.

Playing career
Teixido began his career with the Limoux Grizzlies. In 1994 he was selected by France and played in a test match against Great Britain.

He was subsequently selected to play for France in the 1995 World Cup. In 1996 Teixido moved to the Super League, joining the Paris Saint Germain club.

Teixido spent 1999 with the Sheffield Eagles in the Super League. He was again selected for France for the 2000 World Cup.

In 2001 he toured New Zealand and Papua New Guinea with the French national side. By this time he was playing for the Limoux Grizzlies again.

References

1972 births
Living people
French rugby league players
France national rugby league team players
Limoux Grizzlies captains
Limoux Grizzlies players
Paris Saint-Germain Rugby League players
Rugby league props
Sheffield Eagles (1984) players